Elizaveta Sergeychik (born 19 March 1997) is a Belarusian footballer who plays as a forward for Zvezda 2005 Perm and has appeared for the Belarus women's national team.

Career
Sergeychik has been capped for the Belarus national team, appearing for the team during the 2019 FIFA Women's World Cup qualifying cycle.

References

External links
 
 
 

1997 births
Living people
Belarusian women's footballers
Belarus women's international footballers
Women's association football forwards
FC Minsk (women) players